Irvine Grimmer (7 July 1862 – 5 April 1951) was a South African first-class cricketer. He played for Kimberley in the 1889–90 Currie Cup.

References

External links
 

1862 births
1951 deaths
South African cricketers
Griqualand West cricketers